Gachua Adarsha High School (Bengali: গাছুয়া আদর্শ উচ্চ বিদ্যালয়) is a well-known Secondary School in Sandwip in Chittagong District, Bangladesh. It is a sixth grade through SSC-level institution. The school code is 3344 and EIIN is 104953.

History
The institution was established in 1987 as Gachua Adarsha Girls High School only for girls. The school was reformed combining boys in 2001. The name was then changed to Gachua Adarsha High School. The first batch combining the boys attended Secondary School Certificate (SSC) examinations in 2006.

Nurul Huda, the founding headmaster, contributed a lot to the improvement of the school from the very beginning. He retired in 2009. Nur Chapa, an assistant teacher of Abdul Khalek Academy joined as the headmaster in 2010 through a competitive examination. He went to Katirhat High School in 2010. After that, Delwar Hossain, also an assistant teacher of Abdul Khalek Academy joined Gachua Adarsha High School as the headmaster in 2011; till now he is in the same post.

The people of the school area took shelter during the Cyclones Sidr and Aila in the Karitas bhaban.

SSC Exam Result 
Here are the results of last few years

Academic Focuses

Teachers' Statistics

List of Teachers 

 Delwar Hossain (Headmaster)
 Muhammed Gofur Islam (Ass. Headmaster)
 Md. Amlak Haider
 A K M Shahid Uddin Milad
 Md Iqbal Haydar
 Md Dedar Hossain Bhuiyan
 Farid Uddin Ahmed
 Mohammed Anwar Hossain
 Shamsun Nahar
 Mubarak Hossain
 Anath Kumar Gain
 Sumon Bala

See also
 List of schools in Sandwip
 List of schools in Chittagong
 Kargil Government High School

References

High schools in Bangladesh
1987 establishments in Bangladesh
Educational institutions established in 1987
Schools in Chittagong District